Bellevue means "beautiful view" in French. It may refer to:

Placenames

Australia 

 Bellevue, Western Australia
 Bellevue Hill, New South Wales
 Bellevue, Queensland
 Bellevue, Glebe, an historic house in Sydney, New South Wales

Canada 

 Bellevue, Alberta
 Bellevue, Newfoundland and Labrador
 Bellevue (electoral district)
 Bellevue, Ontario, a community in Kawartha Lakes, Ontario
 Sainte-Anne-de-Bellevue, Quebec
 St. Isidore de Bellevue, Saskatchewan
 Bellevue, Edmonton, a neighbourhood in Edmonton, Alberta

Denmark 

 Bellevue Beach, a beach in Klampenborg north of Copenhagen
 Bellevue Beach, Aarhus, a beach in Risskov, Aarhus
 Bellevue Teatret, a theatre located next to the Bellevue Beach in Copenhagen

France 

 Bellevue Palace (France), a small château built for Madame de Pompadour near Paris in 1750 overlooking the Seine and demolished in 1823
 Bellevue, French Guiana, a village of French Guiana

Germany 

 Schloss Bellevue, a palace in Berlin which has been the official residence of the President of Germany since 1994
 Bellevue station, a station on the Berlin S-Bahn railway network
 Grand Hotel Bellevue, a hotel that existed in Berlin in the 19th and 20th centuries
 , a neighborhood of Schweinfurt, a city in Bavaria
 , a hotel in Dresden

Norway 

 Bellevue (Kristiansand), a neighborhood in the city of Kristiansand in Vest-Agder county, Norway
 Bellevue, the sports stadium of SK Sprint-Jeløy

South Africa 

 Bellevue, Gauteng, a suburb of Johannesburg

Sweden 

 Bellevue (Stockholm), a park in Stockholm
 Bellevue, Malmö, a suburb
 Bellevue (Gothenburg), an area in Gamlestan, Gothenburg

Switzerland 

 Bellevue, Switzerland, a municipality in the canton of Geneva
 Bellevue is an alternative name for Bellevueplatz, a town square in Zurich

United Kingdom 

 Bellevue, Belfast
 Bellevue, Edinburgh, a district in the north-east of New Town, Edinburgh

United States 

 Communities
 Bellvue, Colorado
 Bellevue, Delaware
 Bellevue (Macon), community in Macon, Georgia
 Bellevue, Idaho
 Bellevue, Illinois
 Bellevue, Iowa
 Bellevue, Kentucky
 Bellevue, Bossier Parish, Louisiana
 Bellevue, Calcasieu Parish, Louisiana
 Bellevue, Caldwell Parish, Louisiana
 Bellevue, Plaquemines Parish, Louisiana
 Bellevue, Maryland
 Bellevue, Michigan
 Bellevue, Richmond, a neighborhood of Richmond, Virginia
 Bellevue Township, Michigan
 Bellevue Township, Minnesota
 Bellevue, Mississippi
 Bellevue, Nebraska
 Bellevue, Schenectady, New York
 Bellevue, Ohio
 Bellevue, Oregon
 Bellevue, Pennsylvania, a suburb of Pittsburgh
 Bellevue, York County, Pennsylvania
 Bellevue, Tennessee
 Bellevue, Texas
 Bellevue, now Pintura, Utah
 Bellevue, Washington, a city in the Seattle metropolitan area
 Bellevue (Washington, D.C.)
 Bellevue, Wisconsin
 Bellevue, Saint Croix, U.S. Virgin Islands
 Bellevue, Saint Thomas, U.S. Virgin Islands
 Historic places
 Bellevue (Tallahassee, Florida), listed on the NRHP in Florida
 Bellevue (LaGrange, Georgia), listed on the NRHP in Georgia
 Bellevue (Newport, Kentucky), listed on the NRHP in Kentucky
 Bellevue (Accokeek, Maryland), listed on the NRHP in Maryland
 Bellevue Cemetery, listed in the NRHP in Lawrence, Massachusetts
 Bellevue (Pascagoula, Mississippi), listed on the NRHP in Mississippi
 Bellevue (Morganton, North Carolina), listed on the NRHP in North Carolina
 Bellevue (Kingston, Ohio), listed on the NRHP in Ohio
 Bellevue (Batesville, Virginia), listed on the NRHP in Virginia
 Bellevue (Goode, Virginia), listed on the NRHP in Virginia

Institutions 

 Bellevue Baptist Church, Memphis, Tennessee
 Bellevue College, Bellevue, Washington
 Bellevue University, Bellevue, Nebraska
 Bellevue Medical Center, Lebanon
 Bellevue Hospital Center, New York City, the oldest public hospital in the United States
 Belle Vue Clinic, Kolkata, India
 Bellevue Hospital, Jamaica, Jamaica

Music 

 Bellevue, album by Misteur Valaire 2013
 Bellevue, album by Henrik Strube et al.  EMI, 1990
Bellevue, song by GNR (band)

Transportation 

 Bellevue Station (France), railroad station in Meudon, France
 Bellevue station (MBTA), in West Roxbury, Massachusetts, United States
 Belle Vue railway station, in Manchester, England
 Bellevue Downtown station, a future light rail station in Bellevue, Washington, United States

Other 

 Bellevue Theater, Manila, Philippines
 Bellevue (TV series), a Canadian drama series that debuted in 2017
 , Amsterdam
 The Bellevue Hotel (disambiguation), a list of hotels by that name
 Bellevue Literary Press, an American publisher
 Bellevue, a fictional town in Sacred videogame.

See also 

 Belleview (disambiguation)
 Bellevue State Park (disambiguation)
 Belle Vue (disambiguation)
 Belle Vue Park (disambiguation)